Rupert Charles Farley (born 4 August 1957) is an English actor and voice artist. He has had various roles in movies such as From Hell, The Young Poisoner's Handbook, Shakespeare in Love and Mrs Brown. He is probably best known for his voice acting work, which includes voice over work for television advertisements and animation. He is well known through voice work of Tube Mice, Bernard Cornwall's Sharpe Novels, The Animals of Farthing Wood television series; he voiced several characters, including Fox, Plucky, Trey, Brat and Mr. Pheasant.

References

External links 
 

1957 births
Living people
20th-century British male actors
21st-century British male actors
British male film actors
British male video game actors
British male voice actors
Male actors from London
People from Holborn